Mimacraea abriana is a butterfly in the family Lycaenidae. It is found in the Republic of the Congo, the Democratic Republic of the Congo and the Central African Republic.

References

Butterflies described in 2000
Poritiinae